The Campanelli's Picnic (El Picnic de los Campanelli) is a 1972 Argentine film directed by Enrique Carreras.

Cast

 Adriana Aguirre

External links
 

1972 films
Argentine comedy films
1970s Spanish-language films
1970s Argentine films
Films directed by Enrique Carreras